Confidence means trust or faith in someone.

Confidence or Confident may also refer to:

Concepts
 Confidence (politics), trust in government
 Confidence interval, a term used in statistical analysis
 Confidence trick (or confidence game, or "con"), intentionally misleading a person or persons for gain
 Consumer confidence, a measure of confidence in the economy
 Vote of confidence, a political step
 Analytic confidence, a term used in US government intelligence reports

Arts, entertainment, and media

Films
 Confidence (1922 film), a 1922 American comedy film directed by Harry A. Pollard
 Confidence (1933 film), a 1933 American animated film featuring Oswald the Lucky Rabbit
 Confidence (1980 film), a Hungarian film nominated for the 1980 Academy Award for Best Foreign Language Film
 Confidence (2003 film), a 2003 American film starring Edward Burns, Dustin Hoffman and Rachel Weisz, and directed by James Foley

Literature
 Confidence (novel), by Henry James
 Confidence, a self-help-book by Alan Loy McGinnis
 The Confidence-Man, an 1857 novel by Herman Melville

Music

Albums
 Confident (album), a 2015 album by Demi Lovato
 Confidence (Gentleman album)
 Confidence (Narada Michael Walden album)

Songs
 "Confident" (Justin Bieber song), a 2013 song by Justin Bieber featuring Chance the Rapper
 "Confident" (Demi Lovato song), a 2015 song by Demi Lovato
 "Confidence (Ocean Alley song)", a 2018 song by Ocean Alley
 Confidence (Sanctus Real song)
 "Confidence", a song by Chris Brown from Heartbreak on a Full Moon
 "Confident", a song by Sacha and Tyler Shaw, 2023

Places 
 Confidence, California
 Confidence, Illinois
 Confidence, Iowa
 Confidence, West Virginia